Phalacrocorax is a genus of fish-eating birds in the cormorant family Phalacrocoracidae. Members of this genus are also known as the Old World cormorants.

Taxonomy
The genus Phalacrocorax was introduced by the French zoologist Mathurin Jacques Brisson in 1760 with the great cormorant (Phalacrocorax carbo) as the type species. Phalacrocorax is the Latin word for a cormorant.

Formerly, many other species of cormorant were classified in Phalacrocorax, but most of these have been split out into different genera. A 2014 study found Phalacrocrax to be the sister genus to Urile, which are thought to have split from each other between 8.9 - 10.3 million years ago.

Current taxonomy 
A molecular phylogenetic study published in 2014 found that the genus Phalacrocorax contains 12 species. This taxonomy was adopted by the IUCN Red List and BirdLife International, and later by the IOC.

Alternative taxonomies 
Formerly, the genus Phalacrocorax included all members of the genera Poikilocarbo, Urile, Gulosus, Nannopterum, and the rock shag of Leucocarbo, all of which are now understood to belong to different genera.

The taxonomy adopted by the Clements Checklist classifies all cormorants aside from those already in Microcarbo into Phalacrocorax, leaving just two cormorant genera: Phalacrocorax and Microcarbo.

References

 
Bird genera